The West Toronto Nationals were a Canadian junior ice hockey team in the Ontario Hockey Association (OHA) from 1929 to 1936. Prior to that time, the team was known as the West Toronto Redmen, due to their red colour sweaters. Home games were played at Mutual Street Arena and later Maple Leaf Gardens in Toronto.

The Nationals won the J. Ross Robertson Cup as champions of the OHA in 1930, and defeated the Niagara Falls Cataracts by an 11–9 combined score in two games. The Nationals won the Eastern Canada junior playoffs by defeating teams from Sault Ste. Marie and Ottawa, to earn a berth in the 1930 Memorial Cup played in Winnipeg. The Nationals lost to the Regina Pats in two games by scores of 3–1 and 3–2.

The Nationals were finalists for the J. Ross Robertson Cup in 1931, and were defeated by the Niagara Falls Cataracts by a 12–7 combined score in two games.

The Nationals won the J. Ross Robertson Cup in 1936, by defeating the Kitchener Greenshirts in two games in a best-of-three series. The Nationals were led by Peanuts O'Flaherty who was the league's leading scorer and winner of the Eddie Powers Memorial Trophy. The Nationals won the George Richardson Memorial Trophy as Eastern Canada junior playoffs champions by defeating the South Porcupine Porkies, the Junior Quebec Aces, and the Pembroke Lumber Kings. The Nationals earned a berth in the 1936 Memorial Cup played in Toronto, and defeated the Saskatoon Wesleys in two games, by scores of 5–1 and 4–2.

National Hockey League alumni
Alumnus Roy Conacher was inducted into the Hockey Hall of Fame.

List of alumni who played in the National Hockey League:

 Norman Collings
 Roy Conacher
 Jack Crawford
 John Doran
 Jimmy Fowler
 Bob Gracie
 Red Heron
 Bill Jennings
 Peanuts O'Flaherty
 George Parsons
 Bill Thoms

References

Sources
 

Defunct Ontario Hockey League teams
Ice hockey teams in Toronto